Jeffrey S. Cramer (born 1955) is the Curator of Collections at the Walden Woods Project's Thoreau Institute Library, managing the collections of the Walden Woods Project, the Thoreau Society, the Ralph Waldo Emerson Society, the Margaret Fuller Society, and the Scott and Helen Nearing Papers. He has written and edited 11 books about the works of such American literary figures as Ralph Waldo Emerson, Henry David Thoreau, and Robert Frost.

Jim Fleming of Wisconsin Public Radio said that Cramer "lives and breathes Thoreau.  He may know more about the bard at Walden Pond than anyone else alive."

Cramer has received the National Outdoor Book Award (2004), the Boston Authors Club's Julia Ward Howe Book Award (2005) and the Umhoefer Prize for Achievement in Humanities (2011).

External links
 Author's website

References

1955 births
Living people
American academics of English literature